Şerefiye is a village in the Borçka District, Artvin Province, Turkey. Its population is 199 (2021).

History 
According to list of villages in Laz language book (2009), name of the village is Oxordiya, which derived from Laz language word "Oxordia" and means "big house". Most villagers are ethnically Laz.

References

Villages in Borçka District
Laz settlements in Turkey